This is a list of notable individuals who currently have or previously had an association with Capital University, located in Bexley, Ohio. Capital University is a private liberal arts university of the Evangelical Lutheran Church in America, founded in 1830. In addition to its undergraduate programs, the university also has graduate programs, as well as a law school. Capital is the oldest university in Central Ohio, and one of the oldest and largest Lutheran-affiliated universities in North America.

Notable alumni
Hanif Abdurraqib, poet and music writer
Ron Amstutz, Ohio state senator
Tim Ayers, former mayor and city commissioner, Springfield, Ohio
David F. Bowers, philosopher and Guggenheim Fellow
C.C. Finlay, novelist (class of 1990)
Robert S. Graetz, Lutheran pastor, openly supported Montgomery Bus Boycotts
Jay Hottinger, Ohio state senator (R-31)
Arnett Howard, jazz musician
Chris Jamison, pop singer who appeared on Season 7 of The Voice
Theodore E. Long, former president of Elizabethtown College
Louis H. Mackey, philosopher
Fernando Malvar-Ruiz, Litton-Lodal Music Director of The American Boychoir
Eric Norelius,  Lutheran minister, church leader and writer
Abdul Samad Rabiu, Nigerian industrialist
Harold L. Yochum, class of 1923, theologian, district president of the American Lutheran Church, 9th President of Capital University, delegate to the World Council of Churches

Notable faculty
Dorothy Gill Barnes, adjunct art instructor, 1966 to 1990
Kevin R. Griffith, professor of English, poet
Harold J. Grimm, professor of history and an expert on the Protestant Reformation
Matthias Loy, elected president of Capital University in 1881
William Morton Reynolds, president 1850 to 1853 
James Swearingen, music educator and composer
Harvey Wasserman, liberal, anti-nuclear activist and adjunct professor in the History Department

Law School

Notable faculty

 Jack Guttenberg, legal writer; expert on professional responsibility; co-author of the authoritative source on the Ohio new law of professional conduct for attorneys, Ohio Law of Professional Conduct
 Bradley A. Smith, former commissioner and chairman of the Federal Election Commission 2000–2005

A 2008 survey of faculty scholarship conducted by Roger Williams University School of Law found Capital's faculty to be one of the most productive scholarly faculties in the nation.

Notable alumni

 Jennifer Brunner, Ohio Secretary of State (2007–2010)
 Bruce Edward Johnson, Ohio Lt. Governor (2004–2006)
 Jim Jordan, U.S. Representative (R-OH, 2007–present)
 Greg Lashutka, mayor, Columbus, Ohio (1991–1999)
 Matthew W. McFarland, Ohio 4th District Court of Appeals judge
 Paul McNulty, United States Deputy Attorney General (2005–2007), United States Attorney for the Eastern District of Virginia (2001–2005)
 Deborah Pryce, U.S. Representative (R-OH, 1993–2008)
 Michael H. Watson, District Judge for the United States District Court for the Southern District of Ohio

References 

Capital University people